Hyperion is a concept album by Manticora, released in 2002.

The album is based upon the novel Hyperion by Dan Simmons.

Track listing
A Gathering of Pilgrims
Filaments of Armageddon
The Old Barge
Keeper of Time - Eternal Champion
Cantos
On a Sea of Grass - Night
Reversed
On a Sea of Grass - Day
A Long Farewell
At the Keep
Swarm Attack
Loveternaloveternal...
Bonus tracks
Future World (Japanese Bonus)

References 

2002 albums
Manticora (band) albums
Concept albums
Scarlet Records albums
Albums produced by Jacob Hansen